Mandatory (formerly CraveOnline Media) is a lifestyle website based in Los Angeles with sales offices in New York City, Chicago and San Francisco. The site is owned by media company Evolve Media, LLC. Mandatory focuses its contents into the male-lifestyle audience, but it has diversified into content for all. Mandatory owns 9 websites and has partnered with many more, producing various content for each site. As of February 2021, it is only available in English.

History 
CraveOnline.com was launched in late 2004 by the online media company AtomicOnline, the publishing division of Evolve Media, LLC.

CraveOnline was cited in the 2009 book The Man's Book: The Essential Guide for the Modern Man by Thomas Fink as a top website for men. Regarding CraveOnline, AskMen.com said, "CraveOnline.com combines entertainment and other interests in one place. Great articles, nice pictures and other cool stuff that you won't want to miss."

In March 2013, CraveOnline launched its 3D advertising cube for smartphones and tablets. On May the same year, it launched its own production studio.

In August 2015, CraveOnline was relaunched. Aside from music, the website also began focusing on culture and lifestyle.

In March 2018, CraveOnline changed its name to Mandatory, after a popular section of the site of the same name, with a new tagline "Laugh. Learn. Do Some Good."

Owned or associated websites 
Film and TV: ComingSoon.net, SuperHeroHype.com, ShockTillYouDrop.com
Gaming: ActionTrip, GameRevolution, PlayStation LifeStyle.
Sports: HockeysFuture.com, Sherdog, WrestleZone.

References

External links 
CraveOnline
AtomicOnline

American entertainment websites
Lifestyle websites
American companies established in 2004
Internet properties established in 2004